Complete is a three-CD box set by the English avant-rock band News from Babel. It contains remastered and repackaged releases of the two News from Babel albums, Work Resumed on the Tower (1984) and Letters Home (1986), plus an illustrated CD of their 7" single, "Contraries" (1984). The first album comprises the two song-suites Sirens and Silences and Work Resumed on the Tower, while the second album contains the Letters Home song-suite. The box set also contains a book of song texts and artwork.

Disc 1: Work Resumed on the Tower
Contains all the tracks from the News from Babel LP, Work Resumed on the Tower (1984).

Track list

Personnel
Lindsay Cooper – bassoon, sopranino and alto saxophone, piano, other keyboards
Chris Cutler – drums, electrics, percussion
Zeena Parkins – harp, prepared and electric harps, accordion
Dagmar Krause – singing

Guests
Phil Minton – trumpet ("Victory", "Anno Mirabilis"), singing ("Anno Mirabilis")
Georgie Born – bass guitar ("Black Gold")

Disc 2: Letters Home
Contains all the tracks from the News from Babel LP, Letters Home (1986).

Track list

Personnel
Lindsay Cooper – bassoon, sopranino and alto saxophone, piano, other keyboards
Chris Cutler – drums, electrics, percussion
Zeena Parkins – harp, prepared and electric harps, accordion, ebo guitar

Guests
Bill Gilonis – bass guitar, guitar
Robert Wyatt – singing ("Who Will Accuse?", "Heart of Stone", "Moss", "Waited/Justice", "Late Evening")
Dagmar Krause – singing ("Fast Food", "Late Evening")
Sally Potter – singing ("Banknote", "Dark Matter")
Phil Minton – singing ("Dragon at the Core")

Disc 3: "Contraries"
Contains the News from Babel 7" single, "Contraries" (1984).

Track list

Personnel
Lindsay Cooper – bassoon, piano, horns, marimba
Chris Cutler – marimba
Zeena Parkins – harp, accordion
Dagmar Krause – singing

External links

News from Babel albums
2006 compilation albums
Recommended Records compilation albums